Noorbakhshia is a school of Islamic jurisprudence that emphasizes the Muslim Unity. Its very foundations rests on the belief in Allah, Angels, Prophets, Day of Judgement, the Quran and other Islamic Scriptures revealed upon previous Prophets. While, practices include Prayers (five times in a day) Fasting of Ramadan, Zakah and Pilgrimage journey to Kaaba. These Beliefs and Practices have been excerpted from the books: Usool Aitaqadia (deals with Beliefs) and Fiqh ul Ahwat (deals with Islamic Jurisprudence), which were written by Muhammad Nurbakhsh Qahistani. Nurbakhshia has its own Silsila (Sufi Order) : Silsila-e-Zahab (Golden Chain). This Silsila has Imam Haqiqi (Divinely Appointed 12 Imams): from Imam Ali to Imam Mahdi, and Imam Izafi (Deputy to Haqiqi Imam). The linkage of Imam Izafi stems from renowned Sufi saint Maroof e Karkhi and it will continue until the day of Judgement. Noorbakhshia is the only Sufi order of Islam whose foundations have been laid upon the teachings of Aima Tahirreen (Fourteen Infallibles).

Doctrine
The most important sources of Noorbakhshi doctrines are included within three books: Al-Fiqh al-Ahwat and Kitab al-Aitiqadia, both written by Muhammad Nurbakhsh Qahistani, and Dawat-e-Sofia noorbakhshia, written by Ameer Kabir Syed Ali Hamdani, a Sufi preacher.

History 
In its country of origin, Iran, the order became outright Shi'a some decades after the Safavid dynasty made Twelver Shi'ism the religion of the state in 1501. The same partially occurred in Kashmir either during the lifetime of Shams ud-Din Iraqi, who died in 1527, or in the following decades, during the brief interlude of the Chak dynasty's reign. In Baltistan and Purig, the Sufia Nurbakhshiya still survives as a sect with doctrines of its own that combine elements of both Shi'ism and Sunni Sufi Islam.

Muhammad Nurbakhsh Qahistani was the 15th-century Sufi master to whom researchers have paid less attention. Although Nurbakhsh had many scholar-disciples, including Shaikh Asiri Lahiji, none of his disciples made any serious effort to write Nurbakhsh's biography and to preserve his teachings. However, hundreds of thousands of his followers are still present in the most remote areas of Pakistan. They practise his teachings and are still the custodians of his works and teachings five centuries later.

Nurbakhshis believe that the practices are not an assemblage of his personal views but were originally conceived by him from Muhammad through the masters of the spiritual chain. They state that anyone who questions this connection is invited to travel on the long road through the history of mysticism and to compare it with that of Nurbakhsh's teachings.

Decline of Nurbakshi in Kashmir 
 
The dominance of Sunni Islam in the power corridors of Kashmir, after the period of Nurbakshi influence, was restored by Mirza Muhammad Haidar Dughlat when he conquered Kashmir. Dughlat sent Fiqh al-Ahwat to a Sunni council for its analysis, which resulted in a condemnatory fatwa by the council to ensure Orthodox Sunni and Shi'a Islam and tried to limit Sufi influence.

Mir Danial Shaheed and other prominent figures were killed during the resulting clashes.

In Baltistan and Ladakh 
The Noorbakshia order still exists in Baltistan and Kargil (in Ladakh) as a sect with doctrines of its own that combine elements of Shi'a, Sunni and Sufi Islam. The order used to have many adherents in these areas but has declined in recent times. Many adherents can be found in Baltistan while a few can be located in some villages in Kargil and the Nubra Valley in Ladakh.

See also
 Mir Sayyid Ali Hamadani
 Mir Sham ud-Din Iraqi

References

External links 

 The Tarikh-i-Rashidi of Mirza Muhammad Haidar, Dughlát : a history of the Moghuls of Central Asia — Mirza Muhammad Haidar Dughlat mentions the Nurbakhshis in his History.

Mahdism